William Ewart may refer to:

 William Ewart (British politician) (1798–1869), Member of Parliament between 1828 and 1868
 William Ewart (physician) (1848–1929), English physician
 William Dana Ewart, founder of Link-Belt Machinery Company in 1880
 Sir William Ewart, 1st Baronet (1817–1889), MP for Belfast
 Ivan Ewart (Sir William Ivan Cecil Ewart, 6th Baronet, 1919–1995), Northern Irish naval officer, businessman and charity worker
 William Ewart Gladstone (1809–1898), British Liberal politician, Prime Minister (1868–74, 1880–85, 1886, 1892–94)

See also